Bermondsey is a London Underground station. It is in the eastern part of Bermondsey in the London Borough of Southwark and also serves the western part of Rotherhithe, in south-east London.

The station itself was designed by Ian Ritchie Architects. Although it was originally intended to have a multi-storey office building on the top, London Underground have yet to realise the second phase of the scheme.

It is notable for its extensive use of natural light. The main station entrance is on the south side of Jamaica Road. The station is in Travelcard Zone 2.

History
The station was opened on 17 September 1999. On 17 August 2021 a bus softly crashed into the canopy at the front of the station.

Station design
Like its extension counterparts, Bermondsey station was designed with a futuristic style in mind by Ian Ritchie Architects. Extensively using natural light, it is built in both a cut-and-cover and tube design. The cut-and-cover section is supported by latticed concrete beams allowing light to penetrate to the platform level. The escalators down to this area are lined by flat concrete with a high ceiling to give a feeling of spaciousness. The bored section is encased with metal to keep in line the futuristic and metallic theme of the extension. As with all other deep level stations on the Jubilee Line Extension, Bermondsey station has platform screen doors for passenger safety and comfort.

Connections
London Buses routes 47, 188, 381 and C10 and night routes N199 and N381 serve the station.

Gallery

References

Jubilee line stations
London Underground Night Tube stations
Tube stations in the London Borough of Southwark
Transport architecture in London
Railway stations in Great Britain opened in 1999
Tube station